The name Nock-ten has been used to name three tropical cyclones in the northwestern Pacific Ocean. The name was contributed by Laos and refers to the kingfisher.

 Typhoon Nock-ten (2004) (T0424, 28W, Tonyo) – a strong typhoon which affected Taiwan and Japan, claiming 3 lives.
 Severe Tropical Storm Nock-ten (2011) (T1108, 10W, Juaning) – a relatively strong tropical cyclone which was considered by the Joint Typhoon Warning Center (JTWC) as a Category 1-equivalent typhoon; struck the Philippines and Vietnam, killing 128 people and causing damage worth US$126 million.
 Typhoon Nock-ten (2016) (T1626, 30W, Nina) – the strongest tropical cyclone ever recorded on Christmas Day; made landfall in Philippines, causing 13 fatalities and $123 million worth of damage.

During the 2017 annual session of the WMO Typhoon Committee, the name Nock-ten was retired from the naming lists, and its replacement is Hinnamnor, named after the Hin Namno Conservation Area.

Pacific typhoon set index articles